Bertha Bay-Sa Pan is a Taiwanese-American Director, Writer and Producer. Born in New Jersey and raised in Taiwan, Pan was educated at Boston University (B.A. in Film & Art) and the Columbia University Graduate Film School  receiving a Masters of Fine Arts degree in Directing, while working as a Sales Executive in Film Distribution. Pan's graduate thesis short film at Columbia University, entitled "Face," garnered various awards from Film Festivals worldwide, including the Director's Guild Award for Best Asian American Student Filmmaker and the Polo Ralph Lauren Award for Best Screenplay.

Films
Pan's first feature film was titled Face (like her award-winning graduate thesis short film) – which stars Kristy Wu, Bai Ling, Kieu Chinh, Ken Leung, Treach, Will Yun Lee and Golden Globe Award and Emmy Award nominee Tina Chen. It premiered at the 2002 Sundance Film Festival in the Dramatic Competition, co-written by Oscar nominee Oren Moverman, featured a score by Leonard Nelson Hubbard of The Roots and an original theme song written and performed by Naughty By Nature ; other artists on the soundtrack included Mos Def, Pharoahe Monch, Bahamadia, Adriana Evans, Delinquent Habits, Kim Hill (soul musician) of The Black Eyed Peas, and David Tao. “Face” obtained the CRITICS AWARD for Best Director at the CineVegas Film Festival, The Audience Award at the GenArt Film Festival, and the Grand Jury Award for Best Director at the Urbanworld Film Festival. Pan was nominated for the Bingham Ray Breakthrough Director Award at the Gotham Awards., and awarded the Premio Speciale Prize at the International Women's Film Festival in Turin, Italy. “Face” was released theatrically in 2005, and received glowing reviews from major publications including The New York Times (as a New York Times Critic's Choice), Entertainment Weekly, The Hollywood Reporter, TV Guide, The San Francisco Chronicle, The Star Ledger, The Chicago Tribune, and the BBC, and is currently available on DVD and cable TV.

Pan's Second Feature, Almost Perfect stars Kelly Hu, Edison Chen, Ivan Shaw, Tina Chen, Christina Chang, and Tony Award winner Roger Rees. It screened at various Festivals including The San Francisco International Asian American Film Festival, The Los Angeles Asian Pacific Film Festival (as Centerpiece Film), Hawaii International Film Festival (as American Immigrant Filmmaker in Profile), Friars Club Comedy Film Festival (a Grand Jury nominee), Gwangju International Film Festival (selected as a "Must See Film"), Pune International Film Festival amongst others; and was the Opening Night Film  of San Diego Asian Film Festival, Vancouver Asian Film Festival, and Boston Asian American Film Festival. Pan also received the Philadelphia Asian American Film Festival's HBO EMERGING FILMMAKER AWARD. The film had a limited U.S. theatrical release in 2012, garnering positive reviews from Variety, San Francisco Examiner, The Honolulu Pulse, etc.

Short films and music videos
Pan's graduate thesis short film, which she did at Columbia University was entitled Face like her first feature film, and was awarded a number of accolades, including the Director's Guild Award for Best Asian American Student Filmmaker and the Polo Ralph Lauren Award for Best Screenplay.

Pan has also directed the short films "Sluggers" starring Hassan Johnson and Corey Parker Robinson (which played at Urbanworld Film Festival and New York International Latino Film Festival); Lucy in the Sky starring Zoe Margaret Colletti. Catherine Curtin, Danny Burstein, Quinn McColgan, Kelly Hu, and Whoopi Goldberg (selected by Newport Beach Film Festival, Heartland Film's Indy Shorts International Film Festival, Los Angeles Asian Pacific Film Festival, and Asian American International Film Festival, etc.); segments of Wang Leehom's 3D concert film Open Fire which premiered at Toronto International Film Festival, and produced feature films such as Fighting Fish (winner of Best Feature at LA Femme Film Festival and Nashville Film Festival's New Directors Competition Honorable Mention).

Pan has directed music videos for Slimkid3's (of The Pharcyde) "Just Can't Hold," Chris Trapper's (of The Push Stars) "Wish I Was Cool" and  "Look What The Wind Blew In," and Princess Katie and Racer Steve's "Sand in My Sandwich."

Her Official Production Company is known as "Slew Pictures" launched in 2008.

Filmography
Lucy in the Sky (2018) (short) - Director
Wang Leehom's Open Fire 3D Concert Film (2016) - Segment Director
Almost Perfect (2011) - Writer, Director, Producer
Fighting Fish (2010) - Producer
Face (2002) - Writer, Director, Producer
Sluggers (2001) (short) - Writer, Director, Co-Producer
Face (1997) (short) - Writer, Director Producer

Music Videos
Princess Katie and Racer Steve's "Sand in My Sandwich" (2010)
Chris Trapper - "Look What The Wind Blew In" (2010)
Chris Trapper - "Wish I Was Cool" (2007)
Tre Hardson aka SlimKid3 - "Just Can't Hold On" (2005)

References

External links
Slew Pictures Official Site

Film directors from New Jersey
American women film directors
American women screenwriters
Boston University alumni
Columbia University School of the Arts alumni
American film directors of Taiwanese descent
Living people
Year of birth missing (living people)
21st-century American women